David Baron (1855–1926) was a Jewish convert to Protestantism.

Biography
Together with co-founder Charles Andrew Schönberger (1841 – 1924), they began the Hebrew Christian Testimony to Israel missionary organization, in London, with the purpose of converting Jews to Hebrew Christianity. In addition to writing several books, Baron also contributed articles to the periodical The Scattered Nation. He was involved in the Hebrew Christian movements of the Haskalah (Jewish Enlightenment) period in Europe.

Works by David Baron
 Rays of Messiah's Glory (1886)
 The Jewish Problem - Its Solution or, Israel's Present and Future (1891)
 The Ancient Scriptures and the Modern Jew (1900)
 A Divine Forecast of Jewish History. A Proof of the Supernatural Element (1905)
 Types, Psalms, and Prophecies: Being a Series of Old Testament Studies. (1906)
 Israel's Inalienable Possessions: The Gifts and the Calling of God Which are Without Repentance (1906)
 The Shepherd of Israel and His scattered flock; a solution of the enigma of Jewish history. (1910)
 History of the Ten Lost Tribes: Anglo-Israelism Examined (1915)
 The Visions and Prophecies of Zechariah (1918)
 The Servant of Jehovah: The sufferings of the Messiah and the Glory that Should Follow. An Exposition of Isaiah LIII. (1922)
 The History of Israel: Its Spiritual Significance (19—)
 We have found the Messiah, translated by J. Rottenberg into Yiddish as מיר האבען געפונען דעם משיח, published in 1928.

Notes

External links
 Scattered Nation (1-12) a periodical produced by Hebrew Christian Testimony to Israel and edited by David Baron.
 Scattered Nation (13-28) a periodical produced by Hebrew Christian Testimony to Israel and edited by David Baron.

Converts to Christianity from Judaism
British evangelicals
1855 births
1926 deaths